Tracey Ullman in the Trailer Tales is a 2003 HBO television special starring Tracey Ullman in a spin-off from her sketch comedy series Tracey Takes On...

The special, which was originally conceived as a pilot for a possible series, spotlights just one of Ullman's characters – Ruby Romaine, a Hollywood makeup artist in her seventies. Ruby recounts tales of old and present-day Hollywood as celebrities sit in her makeup chair in the on-set hair and makeup trailer. She also reveals details of her personal life, which includes living with her shell shock Vietnam veteran son Buddy, and their pot-bellied pig, Oinky. The celebrity in Ruby's chair for this particular episode is actress Debbie Reynolds.

The working title for the project was Ruby Romaine, Trailer Trash.  This was Ullman's directorial debut (aside from directing second unit during the fourth season of her series Tracey Takes On...).

Premise
Septuagenarian Hollywood makeup artist, Ruby Romaine recounts the time she decided to retire and the events that followed, including her decision to return to the business.

Cast
 Tracey Ullman as Ruby Romaine, Svetlana, Pepper Kane
 Barbara Bain as Judy Utermeyer
 Maury Chaykin as Dan Weisman
 Paul Dooley as Dean Duaney
 Simon Helberg as Adam (DGA Trainee)
 Steven Held as Buddy
 Galen Hooks as Rap Dancer #1
 Leslie Jordan as Rog Monroe
 Jane Kaczmarek as herself
 Rose Marie as herself 
 Cheech Marin as himself
 John McKeown as Young Skip
 Sam McMurray as Skip Westland
 Nicki Norris as Young Pepper Kane
 Debbie Reynolds as herself
 George Schlatter as himself
 Glenn Shadix as Garland Madden
 Lynne Marie Stewart as Lynn
 M. Emmet Walsh as Wally Westland
 Chris Williams as Assistant Director
 Gary Anthony Williams as Slurr P

Reception

Awards and nominations

References

External links

Tracey Ullman in the Trailer Tales promo

Tracey Ullman
HBO network specials
2003 television specials
2000s American television specials